"Killy Killy Joker" is the fifth single released by Japanese singer and cellist Kanon Wakeshima, and third single from her album, Tsukinami. The song was used as an opening for the anime Selector Infected WIXOSS. The song peaked at #34 on the Oricon Singles Chart and stayed on the chart for eight weeks.

Track listing

Personnel
 Kanon Wakeshima – Vocals, Cello, Piano, Lyrics

References 

2014 singles
2014 songs
Kanon Wakeshima songs
Warner Music Japan singles
Anime songs